Chamillionaire is an American hip hop rapper, record executive, CEO and entrepreneur. His first album, The Sound of Revenge, was released on November 22, 2005. It spawned three singles: "Turn It Up", "Ridin'" and "Grown and Sexy". The album was certified Platinum by the Recording Industry Association of America (RIAA). Chamillionaire's second album, Ultimate Victory, was released on September 18, 2007. It spawned two singles: "Hip Hop Police" and "The Evening News". The album did not receive a certification.

In 2006, Chamillionaire received ten nominations and won four, including Rookie of the Year and Viewer's Choice Award (Wireless People's Champ) at the BET Hip Hop Awards; Best Rap Video at the MTV Video Music Awards. In 2007, Chamillionaire received four nominations and won one, Best Rap Performance by a Duo or Group at the Grammy Awards. In 2008, Chamillionaire received two nominations and won one, Best Mixtape/Street Album at the Ozone Awards. Overall, Chamillionaire has won 6 awards from 16 nominations.

American Music Awards
The American Music Awards is an annual awards ceremony created by Dick Clark in 1973. Chamillionaire has been nominated once.

|-
|2006
|Chamillionaire
|Favorite Breakthrough Artist
|

BET Awards
The BET Awards were established in 2001 by the Black Entertainment Television network to celebrate African Americans and other minorities in music, acting, sports, and other fields of entertainment. The awards are presented annually and broadcast live on BET. Chamillionaire has been nominated once.

|-
|2006
|Chamillionaire
|Best New Artist
|

BET Hip Hop Awards
The BET Hip Hop Awards are hosted annually by BET for hip hop performers, producers, and music video directors. Chamillionaire has won two awards from six nominations.

|-
|rowspan="5"|2006
|"Ridin'"
|Hip Hop Track of the Year
|
|-
|rowspan="2"|Chamillionaire
|Rookie of the Year
|
|-
|Hip Hop MVP of the Year
|
|-
|Ridin'
|Best Collaboration
|
|-
|Chamillionaire
|Viewer's Choice Award (Wireless People's Champ)
|
|-
|2007
|"Hip Hop Police"
|Best Hip-Hop Video
|

Grammy Awards
The Grammy Awards are awarded annually by the National Academy of Recording Arts and Sciences. Chamillionaire has won one award from two nominations.

|-
|rowspan="2"|2007
|rowspan="2"|"Ridin'"
|Best Rap Performance by a Duo or Group
|
|-
|Best Rap Song
|

MTV Video Music Awards
The MTV Video Music Awards were established in 1984 by MTV to celebrate the top music videos of the year. Chamillionaire has won one award.

|-
|2006
|"Ridin'"
|Best Rap Video
|

Ozone Awards
The Ozone Awards is an annual award ceremony that recognizes Southern hip hop. Chamillionaire has won two awards from four nominations.

|-
|2006
|"Ridin'"
|Best Video
|
|-
|2007
|"Doe Boy Fresh"
|Best Video
|
|-
|rowspan="2"|2008
|"Hip Hop Police"
|Best Video
|
|-
|Mixtape Messiah 3
|Best Mixtape/Street Album
|

People's Choice Awards
The People's Choice Awards is an annual awards show recognizing the people and the work of popular culture. Chamillionaire has been nominated once.

|-
|2006
|"Ridin'"
|Favorite Hip Hop Song
|

Teen Choice Awards
The Teen Choice Awards is an annual awards show that airs on the Fox television network. The awards honor the year's biggest achievements in music, movies, sports, television, fashion, and more, voted by teen viewers (ages 13 to 19). Chamillionaire had 2 nominations, and won once.

|-
|rowspan="2"|2007
|rowspan="2"|"Ridin'"
|Teen Choice Award for Choice Music: Rap/Hip-Hop Track
|
|-
|Teen Choice Award for Choice Music: Summer Song
|
|}

References

Chamillionaire